Sheba (Šəḇāʾ;  Sabaʾ; Ge'ez: ሳባ Saba) is a kingdom mentioned in the Hebrew Bible (Old Testament) and the Quran. Sheba features in Jewish, Muslim, and Christian traditions, particularly the Ethiopian Orthodox Tewahedo tradition. It was the home of the biblical "Queen of Sheba", who is left unnamed in the Bible, but receives the names Makeda in Ethiopian and Bilqīs in Arabic tradition. According to Josephus it was also the home of the biblical "Princess Tharbis" said to have been the first wife of Moses when he was still a prince of Egypt.
 

There are competing theories of where this kingdom was, with some placing it in either South Arabia or the Horn of Africa.

Encyclopedia Britannica posits that the biblical narrative about the kingdom of Sheba was based on the ancient civilization of Saba (Old South Arabian: 𐩪𐩨𐩱 S-b-ʾ) in South Arabia. This view is echoed by 
Israel Finkelstein and Neil Asher Silberman who write that "the Sabaean kingdom began to flourish only from the eighth century BCE onward" and that the story of Solomon and Sheba is "an anachronistic seventh-century set piece meant to legitimize the participation of Judah in the lucrative Arabian trade".

Biblical tradition
The two names Sheba (spelled in Hebrew with shin) and Seba (spelled with samekh) are mentioned several times in the Bible with different genealogy. For instance, in the Generations of Noah Seba, along with Dedan, is listed as a descendant of Noah's son Ham (as sons of Raamah, son of Cush). Later on in the Book of Genesis, Sheba and Dedan are listed as names of sons of Jokshan, son of Abraham.
Another Sheba is listed in the Table of Nations as a son of Joktan, another descendant of Noah's son Shem.

There are several possible reasons for this confusion. One theory is that the Sabaeans established many colonies to control the trade routes and the variety of their caravan stations confused the ancient Israelites, as their ethnology was based on geographical and political grounds and not necessarily racial. Another theory suggests that the Sabaeans hailed from the southern Levant and established their kingdom on the ruins of the Minaeans.

The most famous claim to fame for the biblical land of Sheba was the story of the Queen of Sheba, who travelled to Jerusalem to question King Solomon, arriving in a large caravan with precious stones, spices and gold. The apocryphal Christian Arabic text Kitāb al-Magall ("Book of the Rolls"), considered part of Clementine literature, and the Syriac Cave of Treasures, mention a tradition that after being founded by the children of Saba (son of Joktan), there was a succession of 60 female rulers up until the time of Solomon.

Josephus, in his Antiquities of the Jews, describes a place called Saba as a walled, royal city of Ethiopia that Cambyses II renamed as Meroë. He writes that "it was both encompassed by the Nile quite round, and the other rivers, Astapus and Astaboras", offering protection from both foreign armies and river floods. According to Josephus it was the conquering of Saba that brought great fame to a young Egyptian prince, simultaneously exposing his personal background as a slave child named Moses.

Muslim tradition

In the Quran, Sheba is mentioned in surat an-Naml in a section that speaks of the visit of the Queen of Sheba to Solomon. The Quran mentions this ancient community along with other communities that were destroyed by God.

In the Quran, the story essentially follows the Bible and other Jewish sources. Solomon commanded the Queen of Sheba to come to him as a subject, whereupon she appeared before him (an-Naml, 30–31, 45). Before the queen had arrived, Solomon had moved her throne to his place with the help of one who had knowledge from the scripture (Quran 27:40). She recognized the throne, which had been disguised, and finally accepted the faith of Solomon.

Muslim commentators such as al-Tabari, al-Zamakhshari, al-Baydawi supplement the story at various points. The Queen's name is given as Bilqis, probably derived from Greek παλλακίς or the Hebraised pilegesh, "concubine". According to some he then married the Queen, while other traditions assert that he gave her in marriage to a tubba of Hamdan. According to the Islamic tradition as represented by al-Hamdani, the queen of Sheba was the daughter of Ilsharah Yahdib, the Himyarite king of Najran.

Although the Quran and its commentators have preserved the earliest literary reflection of the complete Bilqis legend, there is little doubt among scholars that the narrative is derived from a Jewish Midrash.

Bible stories of the Queen of Sheba and the ships of Ophir served as a basis for legends about the Israelites traveling in the Queen of Sheba's entourage when she returned to her country to bring up her child by Solomon. There is a Muslim tradition that the first Jews arrived in Yemen at the time of King Solomon, following the politico-economic alliance between him and the Queen of Sheba.

Muslim scholars, including Ibn Kathir, related that the people of Sheba were Arabs from South Arabia.

Ethiopian and Yemenite tradition

In the medieval Ethiopian cultural work called the Kebra Nagast, Sheba was located in Ethiopia. Some scholars therefore point to a region in the northern Tigray and Eritrea which was once called Saba (later called Meroe), as a possible link with the biblical Sheba. Donald N. Levine links Sheba with Shewa (the province where modern Addis Ababa is located) in Ethiopia.

Traditional Yemenite genealogies also mention Saba, son of Qahtan; Early Islamic historians identified Qahtan with the Yoqtan (Joktan) son of Eber (Hūd) in the Hebrew Bible (Gen. 10:25-29). James A. Montgomery finds it difficult to believe that Qahtan was the biblical Joktan based on etymology.

Speculation on location
The location of the kingdom mentioned in the Bible was long disputed.

Owing to the connection with the Queen of Sheba, the location has become closely linked with national prestige, and various royal houses claimed descent from the Queen of Sheba and Solomon. According to the medieval Ethiopian work Kebra Nagast, Sheba was located in Ethiopia. Ruins in many other countries, including Sudan, Egypt, Ethiopia and Iran have been credited as being Sheba, but with only minimal evidence. Even a massive earthen monument of the Yoruba people in Nigeria known as Sungbo's Eredo is held by Yoruba oral tradition to have been built in honour of the powerful aristocrat Oloye Bilikisu Sungbo, who is often said to have been Queen Bilqis.

See also
First Kings
Haubas
Sabaeans
List of rulers of Saba and Himyar
Second Chronicles
Qataban
Old South Arabian, a language
Ancient history of Yemen

References

Bibliography
Alessandro de Maigret. Arabia Felix, translated Rebecca Thompson. London: Stacey International, 2002. 
Andrey Korotayev. Ancient Yemen. Oxford: Oxford University Press, 1995. .
Andrey Korotayev. Pre-Islamic Yemen. Wiesbaden: Harrassowitz Verlag, 1996. .
Kenneth A. Kitchen: The World of Ancient Arabia Series. Documentation for Ancient Arabia. Part I. Chronological Framework & Historical Sources. Liverpool 1994.
Andrey Korotayev. Pre-Islamic Yemen. Wiesbaden: Harrassowitz Verlag, 1996, .
Walter W. Müller: Skizze der Geschichte Altsüdarabiens. In: Werner Daum (ed.): Jemen. Pinguin-Verlag, Innsbruck / Umschau-Verlag, Frankfurt am Main 1987, S. 50–56.
Walter W. Müller (Hrsg.), Hermann von Wissmann: Die Geschichte von Sabaʾ II. Das Grossreich der Sabäer bis zu seinem Ende im frühen 4. Jh. v. Chr. (= Österreichische Akademie der Wissenschaften,Philosophisch-historische Klasse. Sitzungsberichte. Vol. 402). Vienna: Verlag der österreichischen Akademie der Wissenschaften, 1982, .
Jaroslav Tkáč: Saba 1. In: Paulys Realencyclopädie der classischen Altertumswissenschaft (RE). Band I A,2, Stuttgart, 1920, Pp. 1298–1511.
Hermann von Wissmann: Zur Geschichte und Landeskunde von Alt-Südarabien (Sammlung Eduard Glaser. Nr. III = Österreichische Akademie der Wissenschaften, philosophisch-historische Klasse, Sitzungsberichte. Band 246). Vienna: Böhlaus, 1964.
Hermann von Wissmann: Die Geschichte des Sabäerreiches und der Feldzug des Aelius Gallus. In: Hildegard Temporini: Aufstieg und Niedergang der Römischen Welt. II. Principat. Ninth volume, First halfvolume. De Gruyter, Berlin/New York 1976, p. 308
Pietsch, Dana, Peter Kuhn, Thomas Scholten, Ueli Brunner, Holger Hitgen, and Iris Gerlach. "Holocene Soils and Sediments around Ma’rib Oasis, Yemen, Further Sabaean Treasures." The Holocene 20.5 (2010): 785-99. Print.
"Saba'", Encyclopædia Britannica, 2013. Web. 27 September 2013.

External links
"Queen of Sheba mystifies at the Bowers" – UC Irvine news article on Queen of Sheba exhibit at the Bowers Museum
"A Dam at Marib" from the Saudi Aramco World online – March/April 1978
Queen of Sheba Temple restored (2000, BBC)
William Leo Hansberry, E. Harper Johnson, "Africa's Golden Past: Queen of Sheba's true identity confounds historical research", Ebony, April 1965, p. 136 — thorough discussion of previous scholars associating Biblical Sheba with Ethiopia.

 
Ancient peoples
Arabian Peninsula
Hebrew Bible places
Sabaeans
Quranic places
African civilizations
Book of Genesis
South Arabia
Former kingdoms